Emotions in the History of Witchcraft is a 2017 book edited by historians Laura Kounine and Michael Ostling, published by Palgrave Macmillan. The book received scholarly reviews in Preternature, Renaissance Quarterly, and Comparative Studies in Society and History.

References 

2017 non-fiction books
History books about witchcraft
Palgrave Macmillan books